The Davis-Oak Grove District is a historic district near Mauvilla in rural Mobile County, Alabama, United States. It is on the western side of Oak Grove Road, north of the intersection with Kali Oka Road. It was placed on the National Register of Historic Places on May 3, 1988.

References

Historic districts in Mobile County, Alabama
National Register of Historic Places in Mobile County, Alabama
Historic districts on the National Register of Historic Places in Alabama